The Olympic is a greyhound racing competition held annually at Brighton & Hove Greyhound Stadium. 

It was inaugurated in 1947 at Wandsworth Stadium. Following the closure of Wandsworth in June 1966 the competition switched to Charlton Stadium which itself closed in September 1971. After an eight year gap the event was resurrected by Hove in 1979 and has remained there since.

Past winners

Venues 
1947–1965 (Wandsworth 600 yards)
1966–1971 (Charlton 600 yards)
1979–present (Hove 515 metres)

Sponsors
1989–1991 (Phoenix Brewery)
1994–2006 (Courage Brewery)
2007–2007 (Stadium Bookmakers)
2008–2008 (Emily Wood Memorial)
2009–present (Coral)

Winning trainers
Brian Clemenson 8
Derek Knight 5
Jack Harvey 4

References

Greyhound racing competitions in the United Kingdom
Sport in Brighton and Hove
Sport in the Royal Borough of Greenwich
Sport in the London Borough of Wandsworth
Recurring sporting events established in 1947